Ilomantis ginsburgae is a species of leaf-dwelling praying mantis from Madagascar. It is the first praying mantis species characterised by its female genitalia. It was named after United States Supreme Court Justice Ruth Bader Ginsburg for her "commitment to women's rights and gender equality" and for her custom of wearing a jabot, a frilly neckwear which resembles the insect's neck plate.

References

External links
Cleveland Museum of Natural History site for this mantis

Endemic fauna of Madagascar
Insects described in 2016
Insects of Madagascar
Ruth Bader Ginsburg
Nanomantidae